Endeavour Massif is a huge, flat-topped massif on the Scott Coast of Victoria Land. The massif extends south from Pa Tio Tio Gap to Fry Glacier and forms the southern block of the Kirkwood Range (Robertson Massif forms the northern block). Shoulder Mountain, Mount Belgrave and Mount Creak rise from the southern part of the massif. Steep coastal cliffs and projecting ridges mark the eastern margin, but there is a gentle slope west from the massif's broad, plateau-like snow summit.

Following additional mapping by the United States Geological Survey in 1999 and consultation between the Advisory Committee on Antarctic Names and the New Zealand Geographic Board, the name of the southern block of the Kirkwood Range was amended to "Endeavour Massif" to provide terminology better suited to the complex nature of the feature. For the sake of historical continuity the name Mount Endeavour has been retained for the summit northwest of Mount Creak. Both features are named after HMNZS Endeavour (formerly John Biscoe), supply ship to the 1957 New Zealand Northern Survey Party.

See also
Bulfinch Ridge

References 

Mountains of Victoria Land
Scott Coast